Andrés Henestrosa Morales (November 25, 1906 – January 10, 2008) was a Mexican writer and politician. In addition to his prose and poetry, Henestrosa was elected to the federal legislature, serving three terms in the Chamber of Deputies, and as a senator for the state of Oaxaca from 1982 to 1988. He was born in Ixhuatán, Oaxaca.

Youth and studies
Andrés Henestrosa started studying at Juchitán, Oaxaca.  Until he was 15 he only could speak his native language, Zapotec. After finishing his basic education, Henestrosa moved to Mexico City and started studying at the National Teacher's School, where he learned Spanish excellently. Then, he studied at the National High School and after, at the Jurisprudence National School, where he started law studies but he did not graduate. At the same time, he studied at the Philosophy and Literature Faculty at the National Autonomous University of Mexico (UNAM). Around that time (1927) one of his teachers, Alfonso Caso, encouraged what would be the start of his career: he suggested Henestrosa write down Zapotec myths, legends and fables, which formed the basis of his first book, The Men Scattered by Dance, published in 1929.

Henestrosa contributed in many ways to Zapotec culture, keeping a line of investigation and exaltation of it; he also was one of the Mexican exponents of the literary movement called Indianismo, since his first book. He also wrote essays and political documents during his long career.

In 1936, the Guggenheim Foundation gave him a scholarship to investigate about Zapotec culture and visited United States at the linguistic, resulting in Zapotec language phonetization, the adaptation of the Latin alphabet and a Zapotec–Spanish dictionary. During this trip, while in New Orleáns in 1937, he wrote one of his most famous books: My Mother’s Portrait ("El retrato de mi madre").

He was a member of the Mexican Language Academy from October 23, 1964, to his death, as numerary member with chair 23. He was the treasurer of the Academy from 1965 to 2000. Andrés Henestrosa was one of the most prominent members of the Mexican intelligentsia.

September 26, 1949 
Henestrosa was supposed to be on a DC-3 that crashed on September 26, 1949, killing all 23 onboard. He had a premonition and instead boarded a train from Tapachula, the city he was traveling from, to Mexico City.

Political career 
In 1929, he supported (as did many UNAM students) the presidential campaign of José Vasconcelos, being an active part of the campaign acts and writing many essays and chronicles. But almost all of the original hand-wrote transcriptions were lost, being published in many magazines and newspapers.

In 1982 he was elected senator for his home state, Oaxaca, as a member of the Institutional Revolutionary Party.

Awards
Belisario Domínguez Medal of Honor, 1993.

References

External links
Brief bio for Andrés Henestrosa''
Book originally written by Henestrosa in 1929, republished by Carla Zarebska
Andrés Henestrosa recorded at the Library of Congress for the Hispanic Division’s audio literary archive on Oct. 28, 1960

1906 births
2008 deaths
Mexican educators
Linguists from Mexico
Members of the Senate of the Republic (Mexico)
Members of the Mexican Academy of Language
Men centenarians
Mexican centenarians
National Autonomous University of Mexico alumni
Recipients of the Belisario Domínguez Medal of Honor
Zapotec people
Writers from Oaxaca
20th-century linguists
20th-century Native Americans
21st-century Native Americans